The Anglican Province of Ondo is one of the 14 ecclesiastical provinces of the Church of Nigeria. It comprises 12 dioceses.

In 2021 the 12 dioceses and corresponding bishops were:
Anglican Province of Ondo; Archbishop: Simeon Borokini
Akoko Diocese; Bishop: Jacob O.B. Bada
Akure Diocese; Bishop: Simeon Borokini
Diocese of On the Coast; Bishop: Seyi Pirisola (formerly Diocese of Ikale-Ilaje)
Ekiti Oke Diocese; Bishop: Isaac Olubowale
Ekiti West Diocese; Bishop: Cornelius Adagbada
Ekiti Diocese; Bishop: Andrew Olushola Ajayi
Idoani Diocese; Bishop: Ezekiel Dahunsi
Ilaje Diocese; Bishop: Fredrick Olugbemi
Ile-Oluji Diocese; Bishop: Abel Oluyemi Ajibodu
Irele-Eseodo Diocese; Bishop: Joshua Sunday Oyinlola
Ondo Diocese; Bishop: Stephen Oni (founded as Ondo-Benin, from the Diocese of Lagos, 24 February 1952)
Owo Diocese; Bishop: Stephen Ayodeji Fagbemi

Archbishops of the Province
Samuel Adedayo Abe, Bishop of Ekiti (re-elected 2007)
?–present: Christopher Tayo Omotunde, Bishop of Ekiti

References

 
Church of Nigeria ecclesiastical provinces